1084 Tamariwa, provisional designation , is a carbonaceous background asteroid approximately 27 kilometres in diameter from the central regions of the asteroid belt. It was discovered on 12 February 1926, by Soviet astronomer Sergey Belyavsky at the Simeiz Observatory on the Crimean peninsula. The asteroid was named after female paratrooper Tamara Ivanova, who died at an early age.

Orbit and classification 

Tamariwa is a non-family asteroid from the main belt's background population. It orbits the Sun in the central asteroid belt at a distance of 2.3–3.0 AU once every 4 years and 5 months (1,610 days; semi-major axis of 2.69 AU). Its orbit has an eccentricity of 0.13 and an inclination of 4° with respect to the ecliptic.

Physical characteristics 

Tamariwa is a common carbonaceous C-type asteroid.

Rotation period 

Several rotational lightcurves of Tamariwa with a rotation period between 6.153 and 7.08 hours have been obtained from photometric observations since 1984. Analysis of the best-rated lightcurve by French amateur astronomer Pierre Antonini gave a period of 6.1961 hours with a brightness amplitude of 0.42 magnitude.

Diameter and albedo 

According to the surveys carried out by the Infrared Astronomical Satellite IRAS, the Japanese Akari satellite and the NEOWISE mission of NASA's Wide-field Infrared Survey Explorer, Tamariwa measures between 24.71 and 30.681 kilometers in diameter and its surface has an albedo between 0.0916 and 0.15.

The Collaborative Asteroid Lightcurve Link adopts the results obtained by IRAS, that is, an albedo of 0.1165 and a diameter of 27.19 kilometers based on an absolute magnitude of 10.78.

Naming 

This minor planet was named "Tamariwa" after Soviet parachutist Tamara Ivanova (1912–1936). The minor planets 1062 Ljuba and 1086 Nata were also named after Soviet female paratroopers Lyuba Berlin (1915–1936) and Nata Babushkina (1915–1936), respectively.

References

External links 
 Asteroid Lightcurve Database (LCDB), query form (info )
 Dictionary of Minor Planet Names, Google books
 Asteroids and comets rotation curves, CdR – Observatoire de Genève, Raoul Behrend
 Discovery Circumstances: Numbered Minor Planets (1)-(5000) – Minor Planet Center
 
 

001084
Discoveries by Sergei Belyavsky
Named minor planets
19260212